Richard K. Eaton (born August 22, 1948) is a Senior United States Judge of the United States Court of International Trade.

Biography

Eaton was born in 1948, in Walton, New York.  He received a Bachelor of Arts degree in 1970, from Ithaca College. He received a Juris Doctor in 1974, from Albany Law School. He worked in private practice in Cooperstown, New York from 1974 to 1975 and then in Walton from 1975 to 1977. He served in turn as regional director, legislative director and Chief of Staff for Senator Daniel Patrick Moynihan, from 1977 to 1983, serving in both New York City and Washington, D.C. He served in private practice in New York City from 1983 to 1991. He again served as Chief of Staff to Senator Moynihan from 1991 to 1993. He returned to private practice in Washington, D.C. from 1993 to 1999.

Trade Court service

On August 3, 1999, President Bill Clinton nominated Eaton to be a United States Judge of the United States Court of International Trade, to the seat vacated by Judge R. Kenton Musgrave. He was confirmed by the Senate on October 22, 1999 and received his commission on October 26, 1999. He took senior status on August 22, 2014.

Personal life

Eaton is married to museum director Susan Henshaw Jones.

References

External links
FJC Bio
Senior Judge Richard K. Eaton Biography on U.S. Court of International Trade website

1948 births
Albany Law School alumni
Ithaca College alumni
Judges of the United States Court of International Trade
Living people
United States federal judges appointed by Bill Clinton